Ryan Peters is a Canadian singer-songwriter who lived in Rutland, British Columbia in his youth. He now bases his career from Vancouver. He is the drummer in indie band Ladyhawk and also contributes to the vocals and lyrics. Peters was one of the original members of the Vancouver incarnation of Jon-Rae and the River, and also was part of the band Alpha BMX. He partnered up with bandmate Darcy Hancock in a side-project called Sports. Peters also tours with Lightning Dust and Daniel Romano.

Discography

References

External links 

Interview

Year of birth missing (living people)
Living people
Musicians from Kelowna
Canadian male singer-songwriters
Canadian singer-songwriters
Canadian drummers
Canadian male drummers